The 2020 James Madison Dukes football team represented James Madison University as a member of the Colonial Athletic Association (CAA) during the 2020–21 NCAA Division I FCS football season. They were led by second-year head coach Curt Cignetti and played their home games at Bridgeforth Stadium.

On July 17, 2020, the Colonial Athletic Association announced that it would not play fall sports due to the COVID-19 pandemic, but that they would permit conference members to compete as independents for the fall 2020 season if they still wanted to compete. At the time of the conference postponement, JMU announced that they would opt to compete as an independent for the fall season, however they officially suspended their fall campaign on August 7 preceding the impending postponement of the NCAA FCS Playoffs.

In September, the NCAA announced changes for the Division I Football championship, with a 16-team playoff being conducted from April 18 to May 15.

The Dukes finished the regular season undefeated and won the CAA South Division title. The Dukes were not selected as the conference champions, instead the championship was awarded to Delaware (who also finished the regular season undefeated). The Dukes received an at-large bid to the FCS Playoffs, where they defeated VMI and North Dakota before losing in the semifinals at Sam Houston State, the eventual national champions.

Previous season

The Dukes finished the 2019 season 11–1, 8–0 in CAA play to win the CAA championship. They received the CAA's automatic bid to the FCS Playoffs where they defeated Monmouth, Northern Iowa, and Weber State to advance to the FCS National Championship Game where they lost to North Dakota State.

Schedule
James Madison had originally scheduled non-conference games at North Carolina and at home against Chattanooga and Merrimack, that were canceled due to the coronavirus pandemic.

The CAA released its revised spring conference schedule on October 27, 2020. For the spring season, the CAA was divided into a North and a South division, with James Madison place in the South Division.

References

James Madison
James Madison Dukes football seasons
James Madison
James Madison Dukes football